Celleporella hyalina is a species of bryozoans belonging to the family Hippothoidae.

It has almost cosmopolitan distribution.

The species has numerous subspecies, eg:
 Celleporella hyalina subsp. hyalina
 Celleporella hyalina subsp. marcusi (Morris, 1980)

References

Bryozoans